Richard Balderston was a priest and academic in the sixteenth century.

Balderston was born in Guisborough. He graduated B.A. from the University of Cambridge in 1488 and M.A. in 1491. He was ordained in 1493 and held livings at Campsall and Coton. He was Master of St Catharine's from 1506 to his death in 1507.

References

Fellows of St Catharine's College, Cambridge
Masters of St Catharine's College, Cambridge
People from Cumberland
1507 deaths
People from Guisborough